Dennis Clay Nutt (born March 25, 1963) is a retired American professional basketball player. He is the head basketball coach at Ouachita Baptist University in Arkadelphia, Arkansas.

Career
Nutt was a 6'2" (188 cm) and 170 lb (77 kg) guard and played collegiately at Texas Christian University from 1981–85. He is now the head basketball coach at Ouachita Baptist University in Arkadelphia, Arkansas. He has worked as a scout for the NBA's Charlotte Bobcats. Previously, Nutt was an assistant coach for Coastal Carolina University men's basketball team, and was the head coach at Texas State University for six seasons before resigning in 2006.

Nutt played in the CBA with the La Crosse Catbirds and the Sioux Falls Skyforce. He played 25 games with the NBA's Dallas Mavericks in the 1986–87 National Basketball Association season then signed with Milwaukee Bucks in 1989 and the Sacramento Kings in 1990. Following his NBA career, he played for Real Madrid in Spain for one year for the season 1989–90.

Dennis Nutt is the brother of Dickey Nutt, former head men's basketball coach at Southeast Missouri State University and Arkansas State University. Dennis Nutt served as an assistant at Arkansas State under Dickey Nutt for five years until April 2000. They are also the brothers of Houston Nutt, who is the former head football coach of the University of Mississippi and the University of Arkansas, and Danny Nutt, a former running backs coach for the Arkansas Razorbacks football team.

References

External links
 NBA stats @ basketballreference.com

1963 births
Living people
American expatriate basketball people in Spain
American men's basketball coaches
American men's basketball players
Basketball coaches from Arkansas
Basketball players from Arkansas
Dallas Mavericks players
La Crosse Catbirds players
Liga ACB players
Little Rock Central High School alumni
Ouachita Baptist Tigers men's basketball coaches
Point guards
Real Madrid Baloncesto players
Sportspeople from Little Rock, Arkansas
TCU Horned Frogs men's basketball players
Texas State Bobcats men's basketball coaches
Undrafted National Basketball Association players